"Perfect" is a song co-written and recorded by American country music artist Sara Evans. It was released in September 2003 as the second single from her 2003 album Restless. The song became Evans' fifth Top 10 hit on the US Billboard Hot Country Songs chart with a peak at number 2. Evans wrote this song with Tom Shapiro and Tony Martin.

Music video
The music video for the song, directed by Bobby G., features Evans singing the song with an old-fashioned microphone in a T-shirt and jeans, as well driving a red car through the desert. It was shot at El Mirage Dry Lake Bed in CA's Mojave Desert.

The video reached the top of CMT's Top Twenty Countdown for the week of January 8, 2004.

Chart performance
"Perfect" debuted at number 55 on the U.S. Billboard Hot Country Singles & Tracks for the week of September 20, 2003.

Year-end charts

References

2003 singles
Sara Evans songs
Songs written by Sara Evans
Songs written by Tom Shapiro
Songs written by Tony Martin (songwriter)
Song recordings produced by Paul Worley
RCA Records Nashville singles
2003 songs